Blakea subvaginata is a species of plant in the family Melastomataceae. It is endemic to Ecuador.  Its natural habitat is subtropical or tropical moist montane forests.

References

subvaginata
Endemic flora of Ecuador
Least concern plants
Taxonomy articles created by Polbot